The Atlantic Jewish Council, founded in 1975, is the Atlantic Canadian local partner of the Centre for Israel and Jewish Affairs, and was previously the Atlantic Canadian office of the Canadian Jewish Congress. According to its mission statement, it is primarily tasked with "Israel advocacy, community relations, fighting anti-Semitism, and promoting interfaith dialogue and multiculturalism." Howard Conter is the president of its board of directors, and its executive director is Jon Goldberg. As a result of the Canadian Jewish Congress' reorganization in 2007, the AJC became an individual member rather than an affiliate organization of the CJC; this was further reformed after the establishment of the Centre for Israel and Jewish Affairs, which subsumed the CJC in 2011. The AJC also owns and operates Camp Kadimah.

Camp Kadimah
Camp Kadimah, founded in 1943 and affiliated with Canadian Young Judaea, is located on the South Shore of Nova Scotia in Lunenburg County. Campers range from 8 to 16 years of age. Many of the campers are from Toronto but there remains a large portion of campers from Halifax. Many of the campers also from Israel.

There are 5 sections are the camp. The youngest sections, Giborim and Goshrim occupy the main side of the bridge. Giborim, the youngest section, means 'mighty', or 'heroes' in Hebrew. Goshrim, for children aged 10–11, means 'bridge builders.' Kochot, the next section, means 'power.' Machar, the eldest section means 'tomorrow.' There is also a Counsellors in Training program that fosters the development of teenagers into adults. The CITs live on the Machar side of the bridge. The camp is Kosher and nut-free. In 2009, ten teenagers from Sderot, Israel attended Camp Kadimah.

Camp Kadimah is a founding member of the Summer Camp Health Initiative, which is aimed at advancing the health promotion and prevention of injuries and illnesses at Summer Camps in Canada.

References

External links
Official site
Camp Kadimah

Jewish political organizations
Jewish Canadian history
Jewish organizations based in Canada
Jews and Judaism in Nova Scotia

de:Canadian Jewish Congress
fr:Congrès Juif Canadien